The Mohring effect is the observation that, if the frequency of a transit service (e.g., buses per hour) increases with demand, then a rise in demand shortens the waiting times of passengers at stops and stations. Because waiting time forms part of the costs of transportation, the Mohring effect implies increasing returns to scale for scheduled urban transport services. 

The effect was named for the University of Minnesota economist Herbert Mohring, who identified this property in a 1972 paper.

Example 
For example, suppose that passengers arrive randomly at a bus stop over the course of an hour, while the bus arrives once per hour. The average waiting time is 30 minutes. If the number of passengers per hour increases sufficiently to justify two buses per hour, then the average waiting time falls to 15 minutes. The presence of additional users lowers the cost of existing passengers. This anti-congestion effect is opposite to the usual road congestion effect, where an increase in the number of the users decreases the speed and the quality of service of the other users.

Transit subsidies 
The Mohring effect is often referenced in support of transit subsidies, on the grounds that subsidy is required to achieve marginal cost pricing when the Mohring effect is relevant. The average cost of a passenger-journey includes the average waiting time, while the marginal cost includes only the average waiting time less the diminution in total waiting time caused by the increase in frequency. Average cost thus exceeds marginal cost, and subsidy that bridges the gap is said to improve welfare.

See also 
 Positive externality
 Network effect

References

Further reading 
 van Reeven, Peran (2008) Subsidisation of Urban Public Transport and the Mohring Effect, Journal of Transport Economics and Policy, Volume 42, Number 2, May 2008, pp. 349–359(11)
 Bar-Yosef, Asaf, Karel Martens, Itzhak Benenson (2013) A model of the vicious cycle of a bus line, Transportation Research Part B: Methodological, Volume 54, pp. 37-50

Public transport